Fahrettin Kerim Gökay (January 9, 1900 Eskişehir – July 22, 1987 Istanbul) was a Turkish politician, civil servant, professor ordinarius and physician. He served as government minister, and is well known for his long-term position as governor of Istanbul.

Early years
He was born on January 9, 1900, in Eskişehir. His father was Hajji Kerim Efendi, a Crimean Tatar from Kerch and his mother Hajji Azize Hanım, an immigrant daughter from Dobruja. After finishing the primary school in his hometown, he studied in a high school in Istanbul.

Gökay was educated at Istanbul University's Faculty of Medicine, from where he graduated as a physician in 1922. He then carried out studies between 1922 and 1924 at universities of Munich and Hamburg in Germany as well as at University of Vienna, Austria, specializing in neuropathy.

In 1926, Gökay became associate professor, in 1933 professor and then in 1942 full professor. He served also as president of the Turkish Red Crescent.

Civil servant
On October 24, 1949, he was appointed governor and mayor of Istanbul, succeeding Lütfi Kırdar (in office 1938–1949).  Gökay served in this post until November 26, 1957. He introduced price controls on staple foods in Istanbul to protect low-income residents. The municipality of Istanbul founded Migros Türk in 1954 as a joint venture with Swiss Migros, initially operating (like its counterpart in Switzerland) via sales trucks. Gökay opened up the area outside of the Walls of Istanbul for urbanization. He also initiated the foundation of around fifty schools in Istanbul. During his term of office, he was nicknamed "Küçük Vali" (literally ) for his small height, and was a favorite figure depicted in cartoons as such. He was blamed for his passive behavior during the Istanbul riots on September 6–7 in 1955, and was tried before the military tribunal on Yassıada after the 1960 coup d'état.

On November 23, 1957, he was appointed Ambassador to Switzerland, where he served in Bern until July 2, 1960.

Politician
In the 1961 general election, Gökay entered politics, running for a seat in the parliament from the New Turkey Party and became deputy of Istanbul. In the cabinet of İsmet İnönü, Gökay served as Minister of Construction and Settlement from July 1962, and then as minister of health and social security between November 27 and December 25, 1963. He retired from politics in 1965.

Gökay died on July 22, 1987, at the age of 87 in Istanbul.

Legacy
A main street in Kadıköy district of Istanbul is named after him. There is an Anatolian High School at Sefaköy in Küçükçekmece district of Istanbul bearing his name.

References

1900 births
People from Eskişehir
Istanbul University Faculty of Medicine alumni
Turkish neurologists
Academic staff of Istanbul University
Turkish civil servants
Governors of Istanbul
Mayors of Istanbul
Ambassadors of Turkey to Switzerland
New Turkey Party (1961) politicians
20th-century Turkish politicians
Deputies of Istanbul
Government ministers of Turkey
Health ministers of Turkey
1987 deaths
Members of the 27th government of Turkey
Grand Crosses with Star and Sash of the Order of Merit of the Federal Republic of Germany
Istanbul pogrom
Turkish people of Crimean Tatar descent